Michel Jourdain Lascurain, better known as Michel Jourdain Jr. (born September 2, 1976), is a Mexican racecar driver, best known for winning two Champ Car races in 2003. He is the 2020 Super Copa GTM Champion.

Formula racing
Jourdain started racing cars in the Mexican Formula Junior series at the age of 12.  He then moved to the Mexican Formula K and Formula 2 series.

In 1996, Jourdain ran several races in the Indy Racing League (IRL) and the CART (now Champ Car) series, including the Indy 500.  At the age of 19, he became one of the youngest drivers to race in both Champ Car and the Indy 500.  Jourdain raced full-time in Champ Car from 1997–2004.  In his early years, he was largely considered a back marker; however, after joining the Rahal team in 2002, he became a championship contender.  Jourdain ended his Champ Car career in 2004 with 1 pole, 2 wins, and 9 podium (top three) finishes.

NASCAR
Jourdain was supported by Mexican sponsors throughout his years in Champ Car.  After losing his sponsorship following the 2004 season, Jourdain looked to the NASCAR Busch Series.  At the time, NASCAR was trying to expand its fan base among Mexicans and Hispanic Americans.

Jourdain made 18 starts driving the number 10 ppc Racing Ford in 2005.  He was able to notch one top ten finish, however in July ppc Racing announced that the team could not continue with a full season due to insufficient sponsorship. He ran two races later in the season for Keith Barnwell. Michel drove in his home race in Mexico City at Autodromo Hermanos Rodriguez as well as two more races in the #15 in 2006 for Jill Burgdoff as well as 7 Craftsman Truck Series races in the Roush Racing #50 truck.

WTCC
In 2007 Jourdain competed in the FIA World Touring Car Championship for SEAT Sport. A troubled season saw him finish the year down in 18th place on points. Later in the year he was signed to drive in the A1GP series for A1 Team Mexico, returning to open-wheel racing for the first time since his Champ Car days.

In 2010, he returned to NASCAR for the Nationwide Series race at Road America when he practiced the #98 for Paul Menard since he was away racing at Infineon. Jourdain also competed in the P-WRC class of the 2010 Rally Mexico where he finished 7th in class.

Rally

During the 2003 Baja 1000 Jourdain, supported by girlfriend Ana Paola Romo, raced a SCORE Baja Challenge class vehicle finishing 6th in their class with a time of 31:01.31

In October 2010 Jourdain and his co-driver Miguel Ángel Diez got the second overall in La Carrera Panamericana in a Studebaker 1953, just 12.9 seconds behind from Harri Rovanperä.

The 2010 and 2011 World Rally seasons saw him start eight rallies with a best finish of 14th in the 2011 Rally México.

Motorsports career results

American open-wheel racing results
(key)

IndyCar Series

Indianapolis 500

CART/Champ Car
(key) (Races in bold indicate pole position)

 ^ New points system implemented in 2004.

Complete World Touring Car Championship results
(key) (Races in bold indicate pole position) (Races in italics indicate fastest lap)

Complete A1 Grand Prix results
(key)

WRC results

NASCAR
(key) (Bold – Pole position awarded by qualifying time. Italics – Pole position earned by points standings or practice time. * – Most laps led.)

Nationwide Series

Craftsman Truck Series

References

External links
 
 

1976 births
Living people
Mexican racing drivers
Mexican people of Belgian descent
Racing drivers from Mexico City
A1 Team Mexico drivers
Champ Car drivers
Indianapolis 500 drivers
IndyCar Series drivers
NASCAR drivers
World Touring Car Championship drivers
American Le Mans Series drivers
Mexican Indianapolis 500 drivers
Carrera Panamericana drivers
Dale Coyne Racing drivers
Rahal Letterman Lanigan Racing drivers
A1 Grand Prix drivers
Bettenhausen Racing drivers
RuSPORT drivers
RFK Racing drivers
Cupra Racing drivers